Fairmount Historic District may refer to:

in the United States (by state then city)
Fairmount Commercial Historic District, Fairmount, Indiana, listed on the National Register of Historic Places (NRHP) in Grant County, Indiana
Upper Fairmount Historic District, Upper Fairmount, Maryland, listed on the NRHP in Somerset County, Maryland
Fairmount Historic District (Califon, New Jersey), listed on the NRHP in Hunterdon County and Morris County, New Jersey
Fairmount Boulevard District, Cleveland Heights, Ohio, listed on the NRHP in Ohio
Fairmount Avenue Historic District, Philadelphia, Pennsylvania, listed on the NRHP in North Philadelphia
Fairmount Historic District (York City, Pennsylvania), listed on the NRHP in York County, Pennsylvania
Fairmount-Southside Historic District, Fort Worth, Texas, listed on the NRHP in Tarrant County, Texas
Fairmount Historic District (Richmond, Virginia), listed on the NRHP in Richmond, Virginia

See also
Fairmont Historic District (disambiguation)